Claudia Lehmann (born 23 April 1973) is a German former professional racing cyclist. She won the German National Road Race Championship in 1993.

References

External links

1973 births
Living people
German female cyclists
Place of birth missing (living people)